Musood "Émile" Ali-Khan (6 June 1902 – date of death unknown) was a French sprinter. He competed at the 1920 Summer Olympics in the 100 m and 4×100 metre relay events and finished in fifth and second place, respectively. The same year he won the national title in the 100 m and equalled the world record over 60 metres (6.8 s).

Ali-Khan started training in sprint while studying at the Lycée Masséna in Nice. He stopped competing individually in 1921, but continued to run relay races.

Some sources give his date of death as 12 May 1960 but this is actually the day that Prince Aly Khan died.

References

External links 

 

1902 births
French male sprinters
Olympic silver medalists for France
Athletes (track and field) at the 1920 Summer Olympics
Olympic athletes of France
Medalists at the 1920 Summer Olympics
Olympic silver medalists in athletics (track and field)
Year of death missing
20th-century French people